Greenwood–Hercowitz–Huffman preferences are a particular functional form of utility developed by Jeremy Greenwood, Zvi Hercowitz, and Gregory Huffman, in their 1988 paper Investment, Capacity Utilization, and the Real Business Cycle. It describes the macroeconomic impact of technological changes that affect the productivity of new capital goods. The paper also introduced the notions of investment-specific technological progress and capacity utilization into modern macroeconomics.

GHH preferences have Gorman form.

Often macroeconomic models assume that agents' utility is additively separable in consumption and labor.  I.e., frequently the period utility function is something like

Note that this is separable in that the utility (loss) from working does not directly affect the utility (gain or loss) from consumption, i.e. the cross-derivative of utility with respect to consumption and labor is 0.

GHH preferences might instead have a form like:

where now consumption and labor are not additively separable in the same way.  For an agent with this utility function, the amount she/he works will actually affect the amount of utility she/he receives from consumption,  i.e. the cross-derivative of utility with respect to consumption and labor is unequal to 0.

More generally, the preferences are of the form

which implies

As a result, the preferences are exceptionally convenient to work with. Moreover, as the marginal rate of substitution is independent of consumption and only depends on the real wage, there is no wealth effect on the labour supply. Using preference without a wealth effect on the labour supply might help to explain the aggregate economic behaviour following news shocks,
and government spending shocks. Their use is also very common in open macro studies.

Generalization: Jaimovich–Rebelo preferences
GHH preferences are not consistent with a balanced growth path. Jaimovich and Rebelo proposed a preference specification that allows scaling the short-run wealth effect on the labor supply.  The two polar cases are the standard King–Plosser–Rebelo preferences and the GHH-preferences.

References
Jeremy Greenwood, Zvi Hercowitz and Gregory W. Huffman (1988) "Investment, capacity utilization, and the real business cycle" (Jeremy Greenwood's website) American Economic Review 78 (3): 402–17.

Notes

Business cycle theories
Utility function types